June Marion Swann MBE (born 1929) is a British footwear historian, formerly the Keeper of the Boot and Shoe Collection at the Northampton Museum and Art Gallery in England, where she worked for 38 years from 1950 to 1988. In the late 1950s she inaugurated the study of shoes hidden in buildings as charms. Swann has been called "the world's leading authority on historic shoes." She is engaged by museums around the world to identify shoes in their collections.

Swann graduated with a degree in geography in 1949, and began to work at Northampton Museum and Art Gallery the following year.  The town was a historical centre for the production of shoes, and she took charge of curating the museum's collection of shoes and related artefacts, the world's largest collection of historical footwear. She became a Member of the Order of the British Empire in 1976, for her work at Northampton Museum.

She was a founder member of The Costume Society, and its chairman from 1980 to 1987.

She retired in 1988 and became a freelance consultant. After retirement she travelled to Sydney to catalogue the Joseph Box Collection at the Powerhouse Museum.  She also assisted with the cataloguing of the Cordwainers College Historical Shoe Collection, from 1992 to 2000.

Publications
Shoes concealed in buildings, Northampton County Council, 1970
A history of shoe fashions, Northampton County Council, 1975
Shoes, Batsford Books, 1982.
Shoemaking, Shire Books, 1987. Reprinted 1993, 1997, 2003, 2008.
"Shoes Concealed in Buildings", Costume Society Journal 30 (1996), pp. 56–69.
History of Footwear in Norway, Sweden and Finland: Pre-history to 1950, Coronet Books, 2001.

See also
Concealed shoes

References

Living people
British women historians
20th-century British historians
21st-century American historians
Members of the Order of the British Empire
20th-century British women writers
1929 births
21st-century British women writers
American women historians
21st-century American women